Xiao Bai (萧白; Liaoning Province, July 1932) is a Chinese conductor and composer. He is an ethnic Manchu. In the West, he is best known for his opera Farewell My Concubine, which toured America with the CNOH in 2008.

References

Chinese male classical composers
Chinese classical composers
Chinese conductors (music)
1932 births
Living people
Musicians from Liaoning
Chinese opera composers
Male opera composers
21st-century conductors (music)
21st-century male musicians